Staten may refer to:
People
Randy Staten (1944-2010), American politician and football player
Roy N. Staten (1913–1999), American politician

Places
Staten Island, a borough of New York City, New York, United States
Staten, West Virginia, an unincorporated community, United States
Staten Run, a stream in West Virginia, United States

See also